Craig Anthony Evans (born 18 September 1989) is a Welsh professional boxer who challenged for the British lightweight title in 2015.

Professional career
Evans made his professional debut on 15 May 2010, scoring a first-round technical knockout (TKO) over Dan Carr at Upton Park in London, England.

After winning his first 14 fights, three by stoppage, he fought Scott Cardle for the vacant British lightweight title on 30 May 2015 at The O2 Arena in London. The bout was part of the undercard of Kell Brook's IBF world title defence against Frankie Gavin. Evans suffered the first defeat of his career via unanimous decision (UD), with all three judges scoring the bout 116–112.

Following defeat to Cardle, he faced 2012 Olympian Tom Stalker for the vacant WBO European lightweight title on 10 October 2015 at the Manchester Arena. The bout was scored a split draw (SD), with one judge scoring it 96–94 in favour of Evans, another scoring it 97–93 to Stalker while the third judge scored it even at 95–95. The pair had a rematch two months later on 19 December at the same venue, again for the vacant WBO European title. The bout was once again scored a SD, with one judge scoring it 96–94 for Evans, another scoring it 96–94 for Stalker and the third scoring it even at 95–95. After securing a points decision (PTS) victory against Jordan Ellison in July 2016, Evans and Stalker agreed to settle the score once and for all in a trilogy fight on 26 November 2016 at the Motorpoint Arena in Cardiff, Wales, with the WBO European title being on the line yet again, although this time the title was in Stalker's possession. Evans defeated Stalker via majority decision (MD) to capture his first professional title. Two judges scored the bout 98–92 and 96–94 in favour of Evans, while the third scored it even at 95–95.

He successfully defended his title against Stephen Ormond in June 2017 before facing undefeated Roman Andreev on 3 February 2018 at the Bolshoy Ice Dome in Sochi, Russia. Evans suffered the second defeat of his career, losing his WBO European title via ninth-round TKO. At the time of the stoppage, Evans was ahead on all three judges' scorecards with 77–75 and 76–75 twice.

He bounced back from defeat with a PTS victory in a rematch with Jordan Ellison in September 2018 before challenging for the vacant WBO European title once again, this time against Boy Jones Jr. on 19 November 2018 at the Hilton Hotel in London. Evans captured the title for a second time, defeating Jones Jr. via UD. One judge scored the bout 98–92 and the other two scored it 97–93. He successfully defended the title in a rematch with Stephen Ormond in June 2019, before facing James Tennyson five months later in a non-title fight on 23 November at the M&S Bank Arena (formerly Echo Arena) in Liverpool. Evans was dropped in the first round en route to an eleventh-round TKO defeat.

Professional boxing record

References

Living people
1989 births
Welsh male boxers
Sportspeople from Newport, Wales
Super-featherweight boxers
Lightweight boxers